British North America comprised the colonial territories of the British Empire in North America from 1783 onwards. English colonisation of North America began in the 16th century in Newfoundland, then further south at Roanoke and Jamestown, Virginia, and more substantially with the founding of the Thirteen Colonies along the Atlantic coast of North America.

With the ultimate acquisition of most of New France, British territory in North America was more than doubled in size, and the exclusion of France also dramatically altered the political landscape of the continent.

The term British America was used to refer to the British Empire's colonial territories in North America prior to the United States Declaration of Independence, most famously in the 1774 address of Thomas Jefferson to the First Continental Congress entitled: A Summary View of the Rights of British America.

The term British North America was initially used following the subsequent 1783 Treaty of Paris, which concluded the American Revolutionary War and confirmed the independence of Great Britain's Thirteen Colonies that formed the United States of America. The terms British America and British North America continued to be used for Britain's remaining territories in North America, but the term British North America came to be used more consistently in connection with the provinces that would eventually form the Dominion of Canada, following the Report on the Affairs of British North America (1839), called the Durham Report.

The Dominion of Canada was formed under the British North America (BNA) Act, 1867, also referred to as the Constitution Act, 1867. Following royal assent of the BNA Act, three of the provinces of British North America (New Brunswick, Nova Scotia, and the Province of Canada (which would become the Canadian provinces of Ontario and Quebec)) joined to form "One Dominion under the Crown of the United Kingdom of Great Britain and Ireland, with a Constitution similar in Principle to that of the United Kingdom," on July 1, 1867, the date of Canadian Confederation.

The Atlantic island of Bermuda (originally administered by the Virginia Company and, with The Bahamas, considered with North America prior to 1783), was grouped with the Maritime provinces from 1783 until formation of the Dominion of Canada in 1867, and thereafter generally with the colonies in the British West Indies (although the Church of England continued to place Bermuda under the Bishop of Newfoundland until 1919).

Over its duration, British North America comprised the British Empire's colonial territories in North America from 1783 to 1907, not including the Caribbean. These territories include those forming modern-day Canada, as well as all or large parts of six Midwestern U.S. states (Ohio, Indiana, Illinois, Michigan, Wisconsin, and the northeastern part of Minnesota), which were formed out of the Northwest Territory, and large parts of Maine, which had originally been within the French territory of Acadia.

Political divisions

When the Kingdom of England began its efforts to settle in North America in the late 16th Century, it ignored Spain's long-asserted claim of sovereignty over the entire continent (Spain's similar claim to all of South America had been refuted when the Pope had divided that continent between it and Portugal in the 1494  Treaty of Tordesillas). Spain's area of settlement was limited to only very southern parts of North America, however, and it had little ability to enforce its sovereignty. Disregarding, as did Spain, the sovereignty of the indigenous nations, England claimed the entire continent (though its western and northern boundaries were not yet clear), which it named Virginia in honour of the virgin queen, Elizabeth I.

England's first successful settlement in North America was Jamestown, established by the Virginia Company of London in 1607, with the second actually being the Atlantic Ocean archipelago of Bermuda, added to the territory of the same company in 1612 (the company having been in occupation of the archipelago since the 1609 wreck there of its flagship, the Sea Venture). Two areas of settlement in North America had been laid out in 1606, with the name Virginia coming to connote the southern area, between Latitude 34° and Latitude 41° North, administered by the Virginia Company of London. The short form of that company's name was actually the London Company, but it came to be known popularly as the Virginia Company. The northern area of settlement, which extended to 45° North (an area that would come to be known as New England), was to be administered and settled by the Virginia Company of Plymouth (or Plymouth Company), which established the Popham Colony in what is now Maine in 1606, but this was quickly abandoned and Plymouth Company's territory was absorbed into the London Company's.

Over the course of the 17th century, Virginia would come to refer only to the polity that is today the Commonwealth of Virginia in the United States of America, with later areas of settlement on the continent considered separate colonies under their own local administrations and all collectively designated as America (less often as North America). The Kingdom of England (including the Principality of Wales) and Kingdom of Scotland remained separate nations until their 1707 unification to form the Kingdom of Great Britain. Scotland's attempts to establish its own colonies in North America and Central America before 1707 had been short-lived, but England brought substantial trans-Atlantic possessions into the new union, when English America became British America. In 1775, on the eve of the American Revolution, British America included territories in the Western Hemisphere northeast of New Spain, apart from the islands and claims of the British West Indies. These were:

 Bermuda
 British Arctic Territories
 The Floridas (East and West Florida, administered separately)
 Indian Reserve
 Newfoundland
 North-Western Territory
 Nova Scotia
 Quebec
 Rupert's Land (the territory of the Hudson's Bay Company)
 St. John's Island (later Prince Edward Island)
 Thirteen Colonies (each one administered separately, soon to become the United States):
 Connecticut Colony
 Delaware Colony
 Province of Georgia
 Province of Maryland
 Province of Massachusetts Bay
 Province of New Hampshire
 Province of New Jersey
 Province of New York
 Province of North Carolina
 Province of Pennsylvania
 Colony of Rhode Island and Providence Plantations
 Province of South Carolina
 Colony of Virginia

Bermuda
The Somers Isles, or Bermuda, had been occupied by the Virginia Company since its flagship, the Sea Venture, was wrecked there in 1609, and the archipelago was officially added to the company's territory in 1612, then managed by a spin-off, the Somers Isles Company, until 1684, but maintained close links with Virginia and Carolina Colony (which had subsequently been settled from Bermuda under William Sayle in 1670).

Although Bermudians, with close ties of blood and trade to the southern continental colonies (especially Virginia and South Carolina), tended towards the rebels early in the American War of Independence, the control of the surrounding Atlantic by the Royal Navy meant there was no likelihood of the colony joining the rebellion. Although the rebels were supplied with ships and gunpowder by the Bermudians, Bermudian privateers soon turned aggressively on rebel shipping. After the acknowledgement by the British Government of the independence of the thirteen rebellious continental colonies in 1783, Bermuda was grouped regionally by the British Government with The Maritimes and Newfoundland and Labrador, and, more widely, with British North America.

Following the war, the Royal Navy spent a dozen years charting the barrier reef around Bermuda to discover the channel that enabled access to the northern lagoon, the Great Sound, and Hamilton Harbour. Once this had been located, a base was established (initially at St. George's before the construction of the Royal Naval Dockyard, Bermuda) in 1794, when Vice-Admiral Sir George Murray, Commander-in-Chief of the new River St. Lawrence and Coast of America and North America and West Indies Station, set up the first Admiralty House, Bermuda at Rose Hill, St. George's. In 1813, the area of command became the North America Station again, with the West Indies falling under the Jamaica Station, and in 1816 it was renamed the North America and Lakes of Canada Station. The headquarters was initially in Bermuda during the winter and Halifax during the summer (both of which were designated as Imperial fortresses, along with Gibraltar and Malta), but Bermuda, became the year-round headquarters of the Station in 1821, when the area of command became the North America and West Indies Station.  The Royal Naval Dockyard, Halifax was finally transferred to the Royal Canadian Navy in 1907.

Prior to 1784, the Bermuda Garrison had been placed under the military Commander-in-Chief America in New York during the American War of Independence. A small regular infantry garrison had existed from 1701 to 1768, alongside the militia, and part of the Royal Garrison Battalion had been stationed there in 1778 but that battalion was disbanded in Bermuda in 1784. The regular military garrison was re-established at Bermuda in 1794 by part of the British Army's 47th Regiment of Foot and the Board of Ordnance also stationed an invalid company of the Royal Artillery there soon after. The Bermuda garrison was to be part of the Nova Scotia Command until 1869 (in 1815, Lieutenant-General Sir George Prevost was Captain-General and Governor-in-Chief in and over the Provinces of Upper-Canada, Lower-Canada, Nova-Scotia, and New~Brunswick, and their several Dependencies, Vice-Admiral of the same, Lieutenant-General and Commander of all His Majesty’s Forces in the said Provinces of Lower Canada and Upper-Canada, Nova-Scotia and New-Brunswick, and their several Dependencies, and in the islands of Newfoundland, Prince Edward, Cape Breton and the Bermudas, &c. &c. &c. Beneath Prevost, the staff of the British Army in the Provinces of Nova-Scotia, New-Brunswick, and their Dependencies, including the Islands of Newfoundland, Cape Breton, Prince Edward and Bermuda were under the Command of Lieutenant-General Sir John Coape Sherbrooke. Below Sherbrooke, the Bermuda Garrison was under the immediate control of the Lieutenant-Governor of Bermuda, Major General George Horsford).), and was expanded greatly during the 19th Century, both to defend the colony as a naval base and to launch amphibious operations against the Atlantic coast of the United States in any war that should transpire.

The Royal Navy, British Army, Royal Marines, and Colonial Marines forces based in Bermuda carried out actions of this sort during the American War of 1812, when the Royal Navy's blockade of the Atlantic seaboard of the United States was orchestrated from Bermuda (New England, where support for the United States Government's war against Britain was low and from which Britain continued to receive grain to feed its army engaged in the Peninsular War, was at first excluded from this blockade). In 1813, Lieutenant-Colonel, Sir Thomas Sydney Beckwith arrived in Bermuda to command an expeditionary force tasked with raiding the Atlantic Seaboard of the United States, specifically in the region of Chesapeake Bay. The force was to be composed of the infantry battalion then on garrison duty in Bermuda, the 102nd Regiment of Foot (with its Commanding Officer, Lieutenant-Colonel Charles James Napier as Second-in-Command) forming one brigade with Royal Marines and a unit recruited from French prisoners-of-war, which was under Napier's command, and another brigade formed under Lieutenant-Colonel Williams of the Royal Marines. The force took part in the Battle of Craney Island on 22 June 1813. The most famous action carried out during the war by forces from Bermuda was the Chesapeake Campaign, including the Burning of Washington in retribution for the "wanton destruction of private property along the north shores of Lake Erie" by American forces under Col. John Campbell in May 1814, the most notable being the Raid on Port Dover to draw United States forces away from the Canadian border. In 1828, His Excellency George, Earl of Dalhousie, (Baron Dalhousie, of Dalhousie Castle,) Knight Grand Cross of the Most Honourable Military Order of the Bath was Captain General and Governor in Chief in and over the Provinces of Lower-Canada, Upper-Canada, Nova-Scotia, and New-Brunswick, and their several dependencies, Vice-Admiral of the same, Lieutenant-General and Commander of all His Majesty’s Forces in the said Provinces, and their several dependencies, and in the Islands of Newfoundland, Prince Edward, and Bermuda, &c. &c c. &c. Beneath Dalhousie, the Provinces of Nova-Scotia, New-Brunswick, and their Dependencies, including the Island of Newfoundland, Cape Breton, Prince Edward and Bermuda were under the Command of His Excellency Lieutenant-General Sir James Kempt GCB, GCH.

The established Church of England in Bermuda (since 1978, titled the Anglican Church of Bermuda) and Newfoundland was attached to the See of Nova Scotia from 1825 to 1839 and from 1787 to 1839, respectively. From 1839, the island of Newfoundland and the coast of Labrador, as well as Bermuda, became parts of the Diocese of Newfoundland and Bermuda, with the shared Bishop (Aubrey George Spencer being the first) alternating his residence between the two colonies. A separate Bermuda Synod was incorporated in 1879, but continued to share its Bishop with Newfoundland until 1919, when the separate position of Bishop of Bermuda was created (in 1949, on Newfoundland becoming a province of Canada, the Diocese of Newfoundland became part of the Anglican Church of Canada; the Church of England in Bermuda, which was re-titled the Anglican Church of Bermuda in 1978, is today one of six extra-provincial Anglican churches within the  Church of England overseen by the Archbishop of Canterbury).Our History. Anglican Diocese of Eastern Newfoundland and Labrador

Other denominations also at one time included Bermuda with Nova Scotia or Canada. Following the separation of the Church of England from the Roman Catholic Church, Roman Catholic worship was outlawed in England (subsequently Britain) and its colonies, including Bermuda, until the Roman Catholic Relief Act 1791, and operated thereafter under restrictions until the Twentieth Century. Once Roman Catholic worship was established, Bermuda formed part of the Archdiocese of Halifax, Nova Scotia until 1953, when it was separated to become the Apostolic Prefecture of Bermuda Islands. The congregation of the first African Methodist Episcopal Church in Bermuda (St. John African Methodist Episcopal Church, erected in 1885 in Hamilton Parish) had previously been part of the British Methodist Episcopal Church of Canada.

New France (Nouvelle-France)
Britain acquired most of  Acadia or Acadie, Nouvelle-France, in connection with Queen Anne's War of 1702–1713, and subsequent lands later. These territories would become the provinces of Nova Scotia, New Brunswick, and Prince Edward Island, as well as parts of Quebec and territories that would eventually form part of Maine.

Britain acquired much of the remainder of Canada (New France) and the eastern half of Louisiana, including West Florida, from France, and East Florida from Spain, by the Treaty of Paris (1763), which ended the Seven Years' War.  (Spain had not taken possession of any of Louisiana, which had been ceded to it under the Treaty of Fontainebleau, from France until 1769.) By the Treaty of Paris (1783), the United States acquired the part of Quebec south of the Great Lakes; at the same time Spain gained West Florida and regained East Florida.

Nova Scotia was split into modern-day Nova Scotia and New Brunswick in 1784. The part of Quebec retained after 1783 was split into the primarily French-speaking Lower Canada and the primarily English-speaking Upper Canada in 1791.

After the War of 1812, the Treaty of 1818 established the 49th parallel as the United States–British North America border from Rupert's Land west to the Rocky Mountains. Then, in 1846, Britain and the United States split the Oregon Country. The United States was assigned lands south of the 49th parallel, but Britain retained all of Vancouver Island (including south of the 49th parallel).

After threats and squabbles over rich timber lands, the boundary with Maine was clarified by the Webster–Ashburton Treaty of 1842.

The Canadas were united into the Province of Canada in 1841.

On 1 July 1867, the Dominion of Canada was created by the British North America Act, 1867. The confederation process brought together the provinces of Canada, New Brunswick, and Nova Scotia. The former Province of Canada was split back into its two parts, with Canada East (Lower Canada) being renamed Quebec, and Canada West (Upper Canada) renamed Ontario.

Following confederation in 1867, the British Army withdrew from Canada in 1871, handing military defence over to the Canadian Militia. With the consequent abolition of the British Army's Nova Scotia Command, and the office of its Commander-in-Chief for British North America, the still-growing Bermuda Garrison was elevated to a separate Bermuda Command.]

Newfoundland, Rupert's Land, and other territories of British North America

Although Newfoundland and Labrador remained separate from Canada until 1949, Bermuda, following Canadian confederation, was increasingly perceived by the British Government as in, or at least grouped for convenience with, the British West Indies. The last administrative link to the Maritimes was the established church. In 1879 the Synod of the Church of England in Bermuda was formed and a Diocese of Bermuda became separate from the Diocese of Newfoundland, but continued to be grouped under the Bishop of Newfoundland and Bermuda until 1919, when Newfoundland and Bermuda each received its own bishop.

In 1870, Rupert's Land, which consisted of territories of the Hudson's Bay Company, was annexed to Canada as the North-West Territories (NWT) and the new province of Manitoba. British Columbia, the British colony on the west coast north of the 49th parallel, including all of Vancouver Island, joined as Canada's sixth province in 1871, and Prince Edward Island joined as the seventh in 1873. The boundary of British Columbia with Washington Territory was settled by arbitration in 1872, and with Alaska by arbitration in 1903.

The Arctic Archipelago was ceded by Britain to Canada in 1880 and added to the North-West Territories. Later on, large sections of the NWT were split off as new territories (the Yukon Territory in 1898 and Nunavut in 1999), or provinces (Alberta and Saskatchewan, both in 1905), or were added to existing provinces (Manitoba, Ontario, and Quebec, in stages ending in 1912).

In 1907, the sole remaining British North American colony, Newfoundland, was granted the status of a Dominion, although starting in 1934 it returned to British administration under the Commission of Government. In 1949, the island of Newfoundland, and its associated mainland territory of Labrador, joined Canada as the tenth province.

Canada became semi-independent beginning in 1867, and fully sovereign on foreign affairs beginning with the Statute of Westminster 1931. Canada gained the right to establish and accept foreign embassies, with the first one being in Washington, D.C.

Then the last vestiges of Canada's constitutional dependency upon Britain remained until Canadians from various provinces agreed on an internal procedure for amending the Canadian Constitution. This agreement was implemented when the British Parliament passed the Canada Act 1982 at the request of the Parliament of Canada.Maton, 1998, article

British North America colonies
Following the 1776 declaration of independence of the colonies that were to form the United States (which was to be recognised by the British Government in 1783), the areas that remained under British sovereignty were administered by the Home Office, which had been formed on 27 March 1782, and which also controlled the military until this was transferred to the War Office in 1794. In 1801, administration of the colonies was moved from the Home Office to the War Office (which became the War and Colonial Office), with the Secretary of State for War thus becoming the Secretary of State for War and the Colonies until 1854, when the War and Colonial Office was split into the War Office (under the Secretary of State for War) and the Colonial Office (under the Secretary of State for the Colonies).

Prior to the signing of the 1846 Oregon Treaty, the North American continental colonies were as follows:

Province of Canada  (previously Upper Canada and Lower Canada)
Newfoundland
Nova Scotia
New Brunswick
Prince Edward Island
Rupert's Land
British Arctic Territories
Columbia District/Oregon Country (shared with the United States)

Administration
Besides the local colonial governments in each colony, British North America was administered directly via London.

From 1783 through 1801, the British Empire, including British North America, was administered by the Home Office and by the Home Secretary, then from 1801 to 1854 by the War Office (which became the War and Colonial Office) and Secretary of State for War and Colonies (as the Secretary of State for War was renamed). From 1824, the British Empire was divided by the War and Colonial Office into four administrative departments, including NORTH AMERICA, the WEST INDIES, MEDITERRANEAN AND AFRICA, and EASTERN COLONIES, of which North America included:

North America
 Upper Canada, Lower Canada
 New Brunswick, Nova Scotia, Prince Edward Island
 Bermuda, Newfoundland

The Colonial Office and War Office, and the Secretary of State for the Colonies and the Secretary of State for War, were separated in 1854. The War Office, from then until the 1867 confederation of the Dominion of Canada, split the military administration of the British colonial and foreign stations into nine districts: North America And North Atlantic; West Indies; Mediterranean; West Coast Of Africa And South Atlantic; South Africa; Egypt And The Sudan; INDIAN OCEAN; Australia; and China. North America And North Atlantic included the following stations (or garrisons):

North America and North Atlantic
 New Westminster (British Columbia)
 Newfoundland
 Quebec
 Halifax
 Kingston, Canada West
 Bermuda

The postal system had a deputy based in British North America, with administration from London.

See also

Atlantic history
British America
British West Indies
British North America Acts
British colonization of the Americas
Canada under British rule
Colonial government in the Thirteen Colonies
Colonial history of the United States
Economic history of the United States#Colonial economy
Former colonies and territories in Canada
Historiography of the British Empire, with long bibliography
History of Canada
New England Colonies

References

Sources

 
 

Further reading
 Bailyn, Bernard. The Peopling of British North America: An Introduction (1988)  excerpt and text search
 Cooke, Jacob E. Encyclopedia of the North American Colonies (3 vol 1993) 
 Foster, Stephen, ed. British North America in the Seventeenth and Eighteenth Centuries (Oxford History of the British Empire Companion) (2014)  excerpt and text search; 11 essays by scholars
 Garner, John. The franchise and politics in British North America, 1755–1867 (U of Toronto Press, 1969)
 Gipson, Lawrence Henry.  The British Empire Before the American Revolution (15 vol., 1936–70), extremely comprehensive study; Pulitzer Prize
 Morton, W. L. The Kingdom of Canada: A General History from Earliest Times (1969)
 Savelle, Max. Empires To Nations: Expansion In America 1713–1824'' (1974) online

 
Former British colonies and protectorates in the Americas
Former colonies in North America
History of Canada by period
19th century in Canada
19th century in the British Empire
19th century in North America
1790s in Canada
1900s in Canada
English-speaking countries and territories